Sheilah Wilson ReStack (born 1975 Caribou River, Nova Scotia) is a Canadian artist working in photography, sculpture, video and installation. ReStack also works collaboratively with her wife Dani (Leventhal) ReStack.

ReStack is an American photographer whose work has been recognized with numerous grants and awards, including the Howard Foundation Fellowship  in Photography in 2017. They have received funding from the Canada Council for the Arts , and have been recognized by Judy Flower's Through the Flower Foundation  and the Ohio Arts Council Individual Excellence in Photography .

ReStack's work has been exhibited in solo shows at Interface Gallery ("Hold Hold Spill") , Blue Building Gallery ("Control is Cassandra") , and the Camden Center for the Arts ("Cuts in the Day," a collaboration with Dani ReStack). These exhibitions have been reviewed positively in a variety of publications, including Artforum  and Bomb Magazine .

ReStack and Dani ReStack collaborated on a trilogy of films -- "Strangely Ordinary This Devotion," "Come Coyote," and "Future From Inside" -- that are collectively titled "Feral Domestic." The films were screened at various film festivals and art institutions and received positive critical attention. In an essay for the Camden Arts Center, Maggie Nelson praised the films for their exploration of queer families and their attention to the everyday details of domestic life. A visual text accompanying the trilogy, also titled "Feral Domestic,"  was commissioned by the Visual Studies Workshop  in Rochester, NY and published in the fall of 2022.

Biography 
ReStack was born in 1975 in Caribou River, Nova Scotia. She graduated from Mount Allison University with a BA in English/French and NSCAD University with her BFA. ReStack then went on to complete her MFA at Goldsmiths College. ReStack teaches, and is Chair of Studio Art at Denison University. In 2017 Dani and Sheilah ReStack's film Strangely Ordinary This Devotion was included in the Whitney Biennial.

Solo exhibitions
2022: Control is Cassandra at The Blue Building Gallery, Halifax, Nova Scotia 

2020: Hold Hold Spill at Interface Gallery, Oakland, CA . 
2014: If Becoming This at Antioch College, Yellow Springs, OH
2013: Build Your Altar at Enjoy Gallery, Wellington, NZ

Exhibitions (in collaboration with Dani ReStack)
2022: Cuts in the Day at Camden Art Centre, London, United Kingdom 
2018: House Becomes You at GAA Gallery, Provincetown, MA
2017: Stack for Carrington's Hyena at Iceberg Projects, Chicago

Performance
2012: The Invisible inside the Visible in a rural Nova Scotian community.

Filmography (in collaboration with Dani ReStack)
2022: The Sky's in There (00:11:24min) 
2021: Future From Inside (23:59min) 
2019: Come Coyote (7min)
2019: Go Ask Joan
2018: A Hand in Two Ways; Fisted
2017: Strangely Ordinary This Devotion

References 

1975 births
Living people
NSCAD University alumni
21st-century Canadian photographers
Women video artists
Women installation artists
Canadian installation artists
21st-century Canadian women artists